During the 1996–97 English football season, Coventry City F.C. competed in the FA Premier League.

Season summary
Manager Ron Atkinson stepped up to the role of Director of Football at struggling Coventry City in early November, with assistant Gordon Strachan stepping up to the manager's seat. A good run of form saw Coventry climb to 11th place in January, but then a decline set in and defeat in the penultimate game of the season made Coventry's 30-year stay in the top flight appear to be over. However, with a win over Tottenham Hotspur on the final day of the season and losses for Sunderland and Middlesbrough, the Sky Blues pulled off a miraculous survival act to book themselves a 31st successive top flight campaign. The key player in the great escape act was striker Dion Dublin, who scored 14 Premier League goals to attract attention from several larger clubs and encourage calls for an international call-up from many observers.

However, Coventry only ultimately avoided relegation due to the three-point deduction imposed upon Middlesbrough, who had been penalised in mid-season for cancelling a fixture at short notice.

Final league table

Results
Coventry City's score comes first

Legend

FA Premier League

FA Cup

League Cup

First-team squad
Squad at end of season

Left club during season

Reserve squad

Transfers

In

Out

Transfers in:  £6,550,000
Transfers out:  £3,380,000
Total spending:  £3,170,000

References

Coventry City F.C. seasons
Coventry City